Darly N'Landu Lufuilu (born 14 July 2000) is a French professional footballer who plays as a midfielder for Slovenian PrvaLiga side Radomlje.

International career
Born in France, N'Landu is of Congolese descent. He was a youth international for France.

Career statistics

Club

References

2000 births
Living people
People from Creil
Sportspeople from Oise
Footballers from Hauts-de-France
Black French sportspeople
French footballers
France youth international footballers
French sportspeople of Democratic Republic of the Congo descent
French expatriate footballers
Association football midfielders
AS Beauvais Oise players
Lille OSC players
Royal Excel Mouscron players
US Avranches players
NK Radomlje players
Championnat National players
Championnat National 2 players
Championnat National 3 players
Belgian Pro League players
Slovenian PrvaLiga players
French expatriate sportspeople in Belgium
Expatriate footballers in Belgium
French expatriate sportspeople in Slovenia
Expatriate footballers in Slovenia